The Human Tissue (Scotland) Act 2006 (asp 4) is an Act of the Scottish Parliament to consolidate and overhaul previous legislation regarding the handling of human tissue.

Its counterpart in the rest of the United Kingdom is the Human Tissue Act 2004.

External links

Acts of the Scottish Parliament 2006
Tissue engineering
Science and technology in Scotland
Organ transplantation in the United Kingdom
Health law in Scotland